Roman Pšurný (born February 23, 1986) is a Czech professional ice hockey player. He was selected by the New York Rangers in the 5th round (135th overall) of the 2004 NHL Entry Draft.

Pšurný played with HC České Budějovice in the Czech Extraliga during the 2010–11 Czech Extraliga season. He played previously for BK Mladá Boleslav, HC Hamé Zlín, HC Slovan Ústí nad Labem and SK Horácká Slavia Třebíč.

Career statistics

Regular season and playoffs

International

References

External links

1986 births
Living people
Motor České Budějovice players
BK Mladá Boleslav players
PSG Berani Zlín players
Czech ice hockey left wingers
New York Rangers draft picks
Sportspeople from Zlín
Czech expatriate ice hockey players in Canada
Czech twins
Twin sportspeople
Medicine Hat Tigers players
HC ZUBR Přerov players
VHK Vsetín players
SK Horácká Slavia Třebíč players
HC Slovan Ústečtí Lvi players
HC Litvínov players
HC Karlovy Vary players